Pedro Ramírez may refer to:

Pedro J. Ramírez (born 1952), Spanish journalist
Pedro Ramírez (footballer, born 1992), Venezuelan footballer
Pedro Ramírez (footballer, born 2000), Argentine footballer
Pedro Ramírez (painter), Spanish painter
Pedro Ramírez (sport shooter) (born 1939), Puerto Rican Olympic shooter
Pedro Pablo Ramírez (1884–1962), President of Argentina
Pedro Ramírez Vázquez (1919–2013), Mexican architect